Sister Ancilla Dent, OSB (born 3 June 1933) is an English Roman Catholic nun, ecological activist, and writer.

Born as The Honourable Rosamond Mary Dent, she took the religious name of Sister Ancilla upon becoming a Benedictine nun. She was a nun at St Mildred's Abbey, Minster-in-Thanet in Kent, England. The elder daughter of William Dent and his wife, Mary, the 19th Baroness Furnivall (27 May 1900 – 24 December 1968), she and her younger sister, Patricia Bence (born 4 April 1935), are the descendants of Barons Furnivall. The barony has been in abeyance since 1968.

Publications

Book 
Ecology and Faith: The Writings of Pope John Paul II, edited by Sister Ancilla Dent, (publ. Berkhamsted, England: Arthur James, 1997).

Green Christians articles 
Bernard of Clairvaux
Holy Wells and Celtic Saints
Gregory of Nyssa
Ecological crisis at Minster Abbey, Ramsgate

References

External links
Christian-ecology.org.uk

Benedictine nuns
English non-fiction writers
People from Minster-in-Thanet
1933 births
Living people
Place of birth missing (living people)
20th-century English Roman Catholic nuns
Daughters of barons